Riding High is the first album by the Dayton, Ohio funk band Faze-O. Released in 1977 on Atlantic Records subsidiary label, She Records, it was produced by the Ohio Players.  They would chart in 1978 with the top ten R&B single, "Riding High".  

"Riding High" went on to be an oft-sampled song for many hip hop and R&B acts from the late 1980s onwards. It was first sampled in Fresh Four's "Wishing on a Star" in 1989, produced by The High & Mighty.

Tracks
 "Riding High" - 5:21
 "Funky Reputation" - 5:10
 "You And I (Belong Together)" - 5:20
 "Toe Jam" - 4:59
 "True Love" - 3:19
 "Get Some Booty" - 2:49
 "Test - This Is Faze-O" - 4:44

Personnel
Keith Harrison - Arp, Clavinet, composer, Fender Rhodes, keyboards, Minimoog, percussion, piano, electric piano, lead and backing vocals
Ralph "Love" Aikens - guitar, talk box, lead and backing vocals 	
Tyrone "Flye" Crum - bass, backing vocals
Robert Neal, Jr. - percussion, lead and backing vocals
Roger Parker - drums, percussion

Charts

Album

Single

References

External links
 Faze-O-Riding High at Discogs

1977 debut albums
Faze-O albums